Hilda Roberts (April 1909 – June 25, 1992) was an English anaesthestist. Roberts was the Associate Chief of Anaesthesia at Toronto’s Women's College Hospital.

Early life and education 
Hilda Roberts was born in April 1909 in the town of Hanley in Stoke-on-Trent, England. She attended the University of Liverpool, where she received her MD in 1935. Following her graduation, she spent six years in the Royal Army Medical Corps assisting in the Anesthesia Department, as well as holding resident positions at other English hospitals prior to that. Roberts then joined the Postgraduate Medical School of London where she lectured on Anesthesia from 1949-1953.

Career 
In 1957, Hilda Roberts became the Associate Chief of Anaesthesia at Women’s College Hospital. She had a lasting impact on the hospital, conducing multiple research studies, as well as helping further establish the hospital’s Medical Library.

Works 
Roberts pioneered numerous research studies in Anesthesia, Spinal Cord Injuries, and Obstetrical Anesthesia that were published a variety of medical journals, including: The Lancet, The Canadian Medical Association Journal, and the Canadian Anaesthetists’ Society Journal.

Death 
Hilda Roberts died on June 25, 1992.

Membership 
She was a member of several associations, including: 
The Academy of Medicine
The Royal College of Surgeons in England
Fellow of the Faculty of Anesthesia

References

External links 
The Miss Margaret Robins Archives of Women’s College Hospital
Department of Anesthesia fonds in the Miss Margaret Robins Archives of Women’s College Hospital

1909 births
1992 deaths
20th-century British medical doctors
Alumni of the University of Liverpool
People from Hanley, Staffordshire
English women medical doctors
20th-century women physicians
British anaesthetists
Women anesthesiologists
20th-century English medical doctors